Stok Kangri is the highest mountain in the Stok Range of the Zazkar Mountains a Trans-Himalayan mountain in the Ladakh region of north India. The peak is located in Hemis National Park, 12 km southwest of the trailhead in the village of Stok and around 15 km southwest of the city of Leh, the capital of Ladakh.

Despite its high altitude, Stok Kangri is a popular trekking peak and is often climbed as an initial non-technical foray into high altitude mountaineering. However, the difficulty of Stok Kangri is often underestimated and the need to acclimatise before and during the ascent makes Stok Kangri an enduring challenge. 
  
In late July and August, all but the top of the peak may be snow-free. The elevation data was verified by GPS readings from 11 satellites at the Summit during a late July 2007 joint Nepalese-US expedition which encountered snow cover for 85% of the final four-hour, four km, 900 metre climb.  Another GPS reading provided a 6136-meter elevation.  The shortest route to the peak is along the Stok valley, following the Stok Chu to Stok village. This valley's grazing landscape, especially near the village, was devastated by the 2010 Ladakh floods, the most severe in decades.

In December 2019, the All Ladakh Tour Operators Association announced that Stok Kangri is closed for trekking and climbing from 2020 to 2023, due to over-tourism. The interval is meant to give the region a chance to recuperate.

Ascent 
The peak is considered non-technical during July–August, but becomes quite technical during the height of winter. Even in summer, novices should be well prepared, with appropriate physical fitness and equipment. The climb is  exhausting and requires a good amount of stamina, both physically and mentally.
The First official winter ascent was made by a British team in March 2002, Led by Ross Cooper, with Chris Hall, Paul Janlid, Mykl White, and Caroline Williams. At the age of 20 years, Ross Cooper was the youngest expedition leader recorded by the IMF.

It can take anything from two to five days to reach base camp from the village of Stok, depending on acclimatisation schedules and fitness levels.

References

Loram, C., 2004, Trekking in Ladakh (3rd Edition), India Trekking Guides, Trailblazer Publications, 304 p., .

Mountains of Ladakh
Geography of Ladakh
Six-thousanders of the Himalayas